Bech is a surname. Notable people with the surname include:

Gitte Lillelund Bech (born 1969), Danish politician
Henry Bech, a fictional character in the writings of John Updike
Jerome Bech (born 1970), Danish painter
Jesper Bech (born 1982), Danish football (soccer) player
Joseph Bech (1887–1975), Luxembourgish politician
Lili Bech (1883–1939), Danish actress
Poul Anker Bech (1942–2009), Danish painter
Tobias Bech (born 2002), Danish footballer 
Troels Bech (born 1966), Danish football player and manager 
Uffe Bech (born 1993), Danish footballer
Zoe Bech (1910–2006), American actress

Danish-language surnames